Prairie Siding is a small farming community located in Southwestern Ontario. It lies north of the shores of Lake Erie. It supports one of the bridges across the Thames River for Southwestern Ontario.

External links 
Prairie Siding at Geographical Names of Canada

Communities in Chatham-Kent